Juan Camilo Pérez Saldarriaga (born October 26, 1985) is a Colombian footballer who plays for Boyacá Chicó.

He can play as center back.

References 

1985 births
Living people
Colombian footballers
Atlético Nacional footballers
Envigado F.C. players
La Equidad footballers
Deportivo Pasto footballers
Águilas Doradas Rionegro players
América de Cali footballers
Deportivo Pereira footballers
Boyacá Chicó F.C. footballers
Categoría Primera A players
Categoría Primera B players
Footballers from Medellín
Association football defenders